The Osborn Range is a small mountain range located on the northwest flank of Tanquary Fiord on north-central Ellesmere Island, Nunavut, Canada. It lies just outside Quttinirpaaq National Park and is one of the northernmost mountain ranges in the world forming part of the Arctic Cordillera.

The only named summit in the Osborn Range is Mount Townsend  at the southwest edge of the Osborn Range near McKinley Bay, formed by the Chapman Glacier.

A well-known glacier called Gull Glacier lies in the Conger Range.

See also
List of mountain ranges

References

Arctic Cordillera
Mountain ranges of Qikiqtaaluk Region